Jefferson Township is one of the nineteen townships of Guernsey County, Ohio, United States.  As of the 2010 census the population was 86, making it the least populous township in Ohio.

Geography
Located in the northern part of the county, it borders the following townships:
Monroe Township - north
Washington Township - northeast corner
Madison Township - east
Wills Township - southeast
Center Township - south
Cambridge Township - southwest
Liberty Township - west

No municipalities are located in Jefferson Township.

Name and history
Jefferson Township was established in 1816. It is one of twenty-four Jefferson Townships statewide.

Government
The township is governed by a three-member board of trustees, who are elected in November of odd-numbered years to a four-year term beginning on the following January 1. Two are elected in the year after the presidential election and one is elected in the year before it. There is also an elected township fiscal officer, who serves a four-year term beginning on April 1 of the year after the election, which is held in November of the year before the presidential election. Vacancies in the fiscal officership or on the board of trustees are filled by the remaining trustees.

References

External links
County website

Townships in Guernsey County, Ohio
Townships in Ohio